Locomotives LVCI 116-119 were 0-6-0 steam locomotives of the LVCI. They were designed for hauling passenger trains.

History
They were built in 1859 by Parent & Schaken, which later became Fives-Lille, for the French army, and sent to Italy for the Second Italian War of Independence. At the end of the conflict they had been incorporated into the stock of the LVCI, a company linked to the French arm of the Rothschild Group. In 1865 the locomotives passed to the Società per le strade ferrate dell'Alta Italia (SFAI), which assigned them the numbers 714-717. Later (probably in 1869) they were renumbered 778-781. In 1885, at the creation of the great national networks, the locomotives passed to the Rete Mediterranea, which numbered them 3948-3951. In 1905, at the time of nationalization, only 3 units arrived at the FS, which registered them as Class 397 with numbers 3971-3973.  They were regarded as obsolete so they were soon withdrawn and scrapped.

References

Further reading
    Giovanni Cornolò, Locomotive a vapore FS, Parma, Ermanno Albertelli, 1998, pp. 182-184. 

0-6-0 locomotives
Railway locomotives introduced in 1859
Standard gauge locomotives of Italy
Rete Mediterranea steam locomotives
Fives-Lille locomotives
Passenger locomotives